Vari's angelshark (Squatina varii) is an angelshark in the family Squatinidae found in Southwestern Atlantic, specifically Brazil.

Description 
This species differs from other Southwestern Atlantic angel sharks in terms of several characteristics comparison, such as dorsal coloration, vertebral counts, dermal denticles, and pectoral fin feature. The reproduction system is viviparous.

Habitat and distribution 
Vari's angelshark inhabits continental shelf of eastern Brazil, ranging from Rio de Janeiro State to Sergipe State. It presumably lives at depths of maximum . There are no deep-water Brazilian fisheries operating at those depths and thus saving this angelshark from possible exploitation.

References 

Squatinidae
Fish described in 2018